Audrey Gwendoline Long (April 14, 1922 – September 19, 2014) was an American stage and screen actress of English descent, who performed mainly in low-budget films in the 1940s and early 1950s. Some of her more notable film performances are in Tall in the Saddle (1944) opposite John Wayne, Wanderer of the Wasteland (1945), Born to Kill (1947), and Desperate (1947).

Early life and education
Audrey Gwendoline Long was born on April 14, 1922, in Orlando, Florida, the first-born child of English parents. Her father, Christopher Stanley Long, was an Episcopal minister, a naturalized American citizen who served as a chaplain with the United States Navy; her mother Ellen Gwendoline Erskine. She spent some time in Hawaii where her younger brother John Stanley Long was born. She was educated at St. Margaret's School in Tappahannock, Virginia, Los Gatos High School in Los Gatos, California, and Disputanta High School, Virginia. She worked as a model before becoming an actress.

Career
In 1942, Long made her screen debut in The Male Animal playing a student. That same year she was cast as a receptionist in Yankee Doodle Dandy. Other bit parts followed in 1943. In May 1943, Long played the character Dora Applegate in the Broadway production Sons and Soldiers. She returned to film work the following year, cast as Clara Cardell, the female lead opposite John Wayne in Tall in the Saddle. In 1945, she performed in another Western film, Wanderer of the Wasteland, playing Jeanie Collinshaw.

In 1947, Long had featured roles in two films noir,  Desperate and Born to Kill. She appeared in many low-budget films from 1948 through 1951, including six in 1948 alone. In 1952, Long made her last film, Indian Uprising, playing the role of Norma Clemson. She retired from acting that year.

Personal life
In January 1945, Long married Edward Rubin, a dialogue director. They divorced in 1951. On April 26 the next year, in California, Long married Leslie Charteris, a British novelist best known for his works chronicling the adventures of Simon Templar in the literary series The Saint. The couple traveled extensively during their marriage, with Charteris using their travel locations as settings for his Saint novels. The two remained together for over 40 years, until Leslie's death in 1993.

Death
Long died on September 19, 2014, in Surrey, England. Upon her death, she was cremated and her ashes were placed in a large urn which contains the ashes of her late husband Leslie Charteris. The inscription on the urn reads "Love Never Dies".

Filmography

 The Male Animal (1942) - Student
 Yankee Doodle Dandy (1942) - Dietz and Goff's receptionist (uncredited)
 Eagle Squadron (1942) - Nurse
 Pardon My Sarong (1942) - Girl on bus with Tommy (uncredited)
 The Great Impersonation (1942) - Anna (uncredited)
 A Night of Adventure (1944) - Erica Drake Latham
 Tall in the Saddle (1944) - Clara Cardell
 Pan-Americana (1945) - Jo Anne Benson
 Wanderer of the Wasteland (1945) - Jeanie Collinshaw
 The Lost Weekend (1945) - Cloakroom attendant (uncredited)
 A Game of Death (1945) - Ellen Trowbridge
 Perilous Holiday (1946) - Audrey Latham
 Born to Kill (1947) - Georgia Staples
 Desperate (1947) - Mrs. Anne Randall
 Adventures of Gallant Bess (1948) - Penny Gray
 Song of My Heart (1948) - Princess Amalya
 Perilous Waters (1948) - Judy Gage
 Stage Struck (1948) - Nancy Howard
 Miraculous Journey (1948) - Mary
 Homicide for Three (1948) - Iris Duluth aka Mona Crawford
 Duke of Chicago (1949) - Jane Cunningham
 Air Hostess (1949) - Lorraine Carter
 Post Office Investigator (1949) - Clara Kelso
 Alias the Champ (1949) - Lorraine Connors
 Trial Without Jury (1950) - Myra Peters
 David Harding, Counterspy (1950) - Betty Iverson
 The Petty Girl (1950) - Mrs. Connie Manton Dezlow
 Blue Blood (1951) - Sue Buchanan
 Insurance Investigator (1951) - Nancy Sullivan
 Cavalry Scout (1951) - Claire Conville
 Sunny Side of the Street (1951) - Gloria Pelley
 The Bigelow Theatre (1951; television series)
 Indian Uprising (1952) - Norma Clemson (final film role)

References

External links
 
 
 Audrey Long profile, afi.com; accessed September 28, 2014.

1922 births
2014 deaths
20th-century American actresses
Actresses from Orlando, Florida
American film actresses
American stage actresses
American television actresses
Western (genre) film actresses
American expatriates in the United Kingdom
21st-century American women